Morneau is a surname of French origin, and may refer to:

Bill Morneau (born 1962), Canadian politician
David Morneau (born 1975), American composer
Isabelle Morneau (born 1976), Canadian soccer player
Justin Morneau (born 1981), Canadian baseball player

Surnames